Dwayne Thomas Welch, Jr. (born June 19, 1987) is a former American football offensive tackle. He was drafted by the New England Patriots in the seventh round of the 2010 NFL Draft. He played college football at Vanderbilt. He was also a member of the Minnesota Vikings, Buffalo Bills, St. Louis Rams, Philadelphia Eagles and New Orleans Saints.

Early years
Welch attended Brentwood High School in Brentwood, Tennessee, where he played quarterback.

College career
Following high school, Welch played football at Vanderbilt University, where he redshirted as a tight end in 2005. As a freshman in 2006, Welch moved to offensive tackle early in the season after injuries to the team's starting tackles and played in seven games. In 2007, Welch was the team's top offensive tackle reserve and also played on special teams, earning the team's Specialist of the Week award against Kentucky. As a junior in 2008, Welch started all 13 games at right tackle, earning the team's Offensive Player of the Week award against South Carolina. In 2009, his senior season, Welch started 11 games at left tackle and twice earned Offensive Player of the Week Award honors. While at Vanderbilt, Welch played with other NFL players such as D.J. Moore, Jonathan Goff, Chris Williams, and Myron Lewis.

Professional career

First stint with Patriots
Welch was drafted by the New England Patriots in the seventh round (208th overall) of the 2010 NFL Draft. He signed a four-year contract on June 4. He was waived during final cuts on September 4, 2010.
Welch was offered a chance to be on the Patriot's Practice Squad, but he politely declined. He later accepted the Vikings Practice squad offer and eventually was activated to the 53 man roster. He was on the 53 man roster for the final four weeks of the season once Steve Hutchinson was placed on IR.

Minnesota Vikings
The Minnesota Vikings signed Welch to their practice squad on September 6, 2010.

Second stint with Patriots
The New England Patriots signed Welch to their practice squad on September 5, 2011. He was signed to the active roster on September 12, 2011. He was released on September 14, 2011. Welch was added back to the practice squad on September 15.

St. Louis Rams
After being added to the Buffalo Bills' practice squad in November, the St. Louis Rams signed him on November 22, 2011. He was waived on May 3, 2012.

Philadelphia Eagles
Welch was claimed off waivers by the Philadelphia Eagles on May 4, 2012.

Personal life 
In the off season of 2013, Welch completed an internship at Merrill Lynch in Private Wealth Management. He made an appearance on MONEY with Melissa on the Fox Business Network on May 29, 2013 where he discussed the internship and the NFL's involvement with player development in post football careers. Following this interview, Welch was named to Business Insider's Top 36 Football Players on Wall Street.

References

External links
Philadelphia Eagles bio
Minnesota Vikings bio
New England Patriots bio
Vanderbilt Commodores bio

Living people
1987 births
People from Brentwood, Tennessee
Players of American football from Tennessee
American football offensive tackles
Vanderbilt Commodores football players
New England Patriots players
Minnesota Vikings players
Buffalo Bills players
St. Louis Rams players
Philadelphia Eagles players
New Orleans Saints players
People from Deltona, Florida